Olga Levenkova (born 11 January 1984 in Kemerovo) is a Russian heptathlete.

Achievements

External links

1984 births
Living people
Russian heptathletes